Oakwood is a city in Hall County, Georgia, United States. It is part of the Gainesville, GA Metropolitan Statistical Area. The population was 4,822 at the 2020 census, up from 3,970 in 2010. Oakwood is home to the University of North Georgia Gainesville Campus and Wayne Farms.

Geography
Oakwood is located southwest of the center of Hall County at  (34.230976, −83.882364). It is bordered to the northeast by the city of Gainesville, the county seat, and to the southwest by the city of Flowery Branch.

Interstate 985 travels through the southeastern part of Oakwood, with access from Exits 16 and 17.

History
The Georgia General Assembly incorporated Oakwood in 1903.

Demographics

2020 census

As of the 2020 United States census, there were 4,822 people, 1,445 households, and 932 families residing in the city.

2000 census
As of the census of 2000, there were 2,689 people, 1,031 households, and 686 families residing in the city. The racial makeup of the city was 76.76% White, 10.45% African American, 0.30% Native American, 3.12% Asian, 0.11% Pacific Islander, 7.59% from other races, and 1.67% from two or more races. Hispanic or Latino of any race were 20.68% of the population.

There were 1,031 households, out of which 38.8% had children under the age of 18 living with them, 45.4% were married couples living together, 15.0% had a female householder with no husband present, and 33.4% were non-families. 24.4% of all households were made up of individuals, and 3.4% had someone living alone who was 65 years of age or older.  The average household size was 2.58 and the average family size was 3.04.

In the city, the population was spread out, with 27.0% under the age of 18, 13.8% from 18 to 24, 39.3% from 25 to 44, 14.2% from 45 to 64, and 5.8% who were 65 years of age or older.  The median age was 28 years. For every 100 females, there were 104.3 males.  For every 100 females age 18 and over, there were 103.9 males.

The median income for a household in the city was $37,862, and the median income for a family was $43,308. Males had a median income of $31,413 versus $21,414 for females. The per capita income for the city was $16,083.  About 7.2% of families and 10.6% of the population were below the poverty line, including 8.6% of those under age 18 and 15.7% of those age 65 or over.

References

External links
City of Oakwood official website

Cities in Georgia (U.S. state)
Cities in Hall County, Georgia
Populated places established in 1896